Stratakis is a Greek surname. Notable people with the surname include:
Catherine Stratakis (born 1978), American-born Greek footballer
Emmanuel Stratakis, Greek physicist
Nikos Stratakis (born 1980), Greek artist
Nikos-Georgios Stratakis (born 1983), Greek footballer

See also
Argyro Strataki (born 1975), Greek heptathlete

Greek-language surnames